Lake Cecil is a small lake located north-northeast of the hamlet of Trout Creek in Delaware County, New York. It drains south via an unnamed creek that flows into Trout Creek.

See also
 List of lakes in New York

References 

Cecil
Cecil